Anna Swiderek (born ) is a Polish volleyball player. She was part of the Poland women's national volleyball team.

She participated in the 2004 FIVB Volleyball World Grand Prix.
On club level she played for Scavolini, Pesaro, ITA in 2004.

References

1979 births
Living people
Polish women's volleyball players
Place of birth missing (living people)